Andre Agassi and Petr Korda were the defending champions, but Agassi did not compete this year. Korda teamed up with Stefan Edberg and lost in second round to Cyril Suk and Daniel Vacek.

Alex O'Brien and Sandon Stolle won the title by defeating Wayne Ferreira and Mark Kratzmann 6–7, 6–3, 6–2 in the final.

Seeds
The top four seeds received a bye to the second round.

Draw

Finals

Top half

Bottom half

Qualifying

Qualifying seeds

Qualifiers

First qualifier

Second qualifier

References

External links
 Official results archive (ATP)
 Official results archive (ITF)

Doubles